Henry Scarpelli (July 30, 1930 – April 4, 2010) was an American comic book artist. His work won him recognition from the industry, including the Shazam Award for Best Inker (Humor Division) in 1970, for his work on Date With Debbi, Leave It to Binky, and other DC comics, including the series based on the Margie television sit-com.  He is also noted for his work for Archie Comics, including drawing the daily Archie comic strip for most of the 1990s and 2000s.

His son is actor Glenn Scarpelli, who has appeared in several one-off features in the Archie books under the umbrella title "Glenn Scarpelli in Hollywood".

Death
Scarpelli died at the age of 79 on April 4, 2010, after a long illness.

Notes

References

Henry Scarpelli at Lambiek's Comiclopedia

External links
Archie comic strip

1930 births
2010 deaths
Archie Comics
People from Staten Island